Muthaaram is a 2011-2014 Indian Tamil-language soap opera starring Devayani, Vijayalakshmi, Neenu Karthika, Dr. Shaju, Sathyapriya, Manjari and Pooja Lokesh. It is a well known television series of sun TV. It aired on Sun TV 14 November 2011 to 25 January 2014 on Monday to Friday at 11AM later 12:30PM (IST) for 564 episodes. Later extended up to Saturday.

It was produced by Cine Times Entertainment and director by R.Ganesh and Sundar K. Vijayan . The title track was composed by Dhina and sung by Shweta Mohan and M. G. Sreekumar and Lyrics by Vairamuthu. It was also aired in Sri Lanka Tamil Channel on Shakthi TV.

Plot
Mutharam's lead is a Police Officer who fights against criminals is her past life and feels guilty of being a criminal's daughter. Due to some twists and turns she is forced to wear the uniform again. Her fight against her old and new enemies is the story line.

Cast
Main cast

 Devayani (Episodes: 1-392)/ Vijayalakshmi (393-518)/ Neenu Karthika (Episodes: 530-564) (after plastic surgery) as Ranjini Murali and Sivaranjani Shridhar 
 Dr.Shaju as Murali (Ranjini's 1st husband)
 Kamal Kandh as Shiva (Ranjini's 2nd Husband)
 Senu as Shridhar (Shivaranjani's husband)
 Raja as Surya (Murali's younger brother)
 Shabnum/Vinitha as Madhu (Surya's younger sister)
 Murali Dharan as Ganesh (Shandy's Ex husband)
 Sathyapriya as Saradha (Episodes: 2-564)

Additional cast

 Manjari Vinodhini as Mangai (Episodes: 150-406) (Antagonist) died in the serial
 Sharath as Mangai's husband
 Neepa (Episodes: 200-378) / Pooja Lokesh (Episodes: 379-562) as Sandhiya aka Sandy 
 Joker Thulasi as Dharmalingam
 Shyam Sundhar as Suresh (Episodes: 443-564)
 Afsar Babu as Shandy's father
 Anuradha as Rajalakshmi (Shandy's mother) (Episodes:390-559)
 Rindhya as Geetha  (Shandy's sister)
 Swaminathan as Vimal (Puspha's Husband (Episodes: 2-564)
 Bhavani / J.Lalitha as Ranjani's mother
 Ziah as Gomathy
 Ramya Shankar as Aishwarya (Episodes: 2-564)
 Vaijayanthi as Karthika, Aiswarya's Sister
 R.Radha as Bramma's ex fiancé
 Navindhar as Bramma
 Guhan Shanmugam as Raja Raman
 Divya Bharathi as Pusphalatha
 'Kambar' Jayaraman as Vimal's Father Puspha's uncle
 Sheela\Deepa as Aiswarya's Mother
 Ravi Varma as Aishwarya's Father
 V R Thilagam/Suresh Krishnamoorthy as Ranjani and Sivaranjani's Father
 K.Veera as Samiappan
 Jeyamani -> Kadhalkannan   as Udaiappan
 Udumalai Ravi as Ravi Kumar
 Baby jashika
 Sumathi Sree as Shandy's Aunty

References

External links
 Official Website 

Sun TV original programming
Tamil-language police television series
2011 Tamil-language television series debuts
Tamil-language television shows
2014 Tamil-language television series endings
2010s Tamil-language television series